James Stevenson (31 December 1872 – 3 March 1925) was a Scottish footballer who played for Dumbarton (two spells), Preston North End (two spells), Bristol St George and West Bromwich Albion. For much of his career he played as a forward but in his later years operated at centre half.

He was selected for the annual Home Scots v Anglo-Scots trial match in 1903, but never played for Scotland at full international level.

Stevenson was from Dumbarton, where he was killed in 1925 in a boiler room accident at Denny's Shipbuilding Yard. He had eight children with his wife Jessie Jane, née Strachan; their sixth child was the civil servant Sir Matthew Stevenson.

References

1872 births
1925 deaths
Scottish footballers
Dumbarton F.C. players
Preston North End F.C. players
Roman Glass St George F.C. players
West Bromwich Albion F.C. players
Scottish Football League players
English Football League players
Sportspeople from Dumbarton
Footballers from West Dunbartonshire
Association football central defenders
Association football forwards